Deutsche Schachzeitung (English: "German Chess Paper") was the first German chess magazine.
Founded in 1846 by Ludwig Bledow under the title Schachzeitung der Berliner Schachgesellschaft and appearing monthly, it took the name Deutsche Schachzeitung in 1872.  (Another magazine used the title Deutsche Schachzeitung from 1846 to 1848.)
When it ceased publication in December 1988, it was the oldest existing magazine in the world, having been published regularly since its founding in 1846 except for a five-year break  (1945–1949) following World War II.

Since January 1989, the Deutsche Schachzeitung was merged in the Deutsche Schachblätter – Schach-Report which was edited in Hollfeld. The resulting magazine appeared with the names of both former magazines on its cover till December 1996.  Since January 1997, this magazine again was merged in the Berlin magazine Schach. The resulting magazine kept the names Schach and Schach-Report on its cover for one year, but the name Deutsche Schachzeitung had disappeared from the cover. Since 1998, the magazine appears under the simple Schach. However, the table of contents is still headed by the names Deutsche Schachzeitung, Deutsche Schachblätter and Schach-Report.
The Deutsche Schachzeitung was in its prime in the first two decades of the 20th century.

Editors
{| class="wikitable"
! From    !! To      !! Editors
|-
| 1846.07 || 1846.08 || Ludwig Bledow
|-
| 1846.09 || 1851    || Wilhelm Hanstein, Otto von Oppen
|-
| 1851    || 1852    || Otto von Oppen, N.D. Nathan
|-
| 1852    || 1858    || Otto von Oppen
|-
| 1858.12 || 1864    || Max Lange
|-
| 1865.01 || 1866    || E. von Schmidt, Johannes Minckwitz
|-
| 1867    || 1871    || Johannes Minckwitz
|-
| 1872    || 1876    || Johannes Minckwitz, Adolf Anderssen
|-
| 1876.12 || 1878    || Dr. Constantin Schwede, Adolf Anderssen
|-
| 1879.01 || 1886.12 || Johannes Minckwitz
|-
| 1887.01 || 1891    || Curt von Bardeleben, Hermann von Gottschall 
|-
| 1892    || 1896    || Hermann von Gottschall 
|-
| 1897    ||         || Siegbert Tarrasch 
|-
| 1898    ||         || Johann Berger, Paul Lipke
|-
| 1899    || 1916    || Johann Berger, Carl Schlechter
|-
| 1917    || 1918    || Carl Schlechter
|-
| 1919    || 1921    || Jacques Mieses
|-
| 1922    || 1923    || Friedrich Palitzsch
|-
| 1924    ||         || Friedrich Palitzsch, Ernst Grünfeld
|-
| 1925    ||         || Max Blümich, Friedrich Palitzsch, Ernst Grünfeld
|-
| 1926    ||         || Max Blümich, Friedrich Palitzsch
|-
| 1927    || 1931    || Max Blümich, Friedrich Palitzsch, Heinrich Ranneforth
|-
| 1932.02 || 1942    || Max Blümich, Heinrich Ranneforth, Josef Halumbirek
|-
| 1942.03 || 1942.04 || Heinrich Ranneforth, Josef Halumbirek
|-
| 1942.05 || 1943.03 || Theodor Gerbec, Heinrich Ranneforth, Josef Halumbirek
|-
| 1943.04 || 1944.09 || Ludwig Rellstab
|-
| 1950.12 || 1988    || Rudolf Teschner
|-
|}

Notes

References
 Deutsche Schachzeitung, 
 Deutsche Schachzeitung archive at HathiTrust

1846 in chess
1988 in chess
1846 establishments in Germany
1988 disestablishments in Germany
Chess periodicals
Chess in Germany
Defunct magazines published in Germany
German-language magazines
Magazines established in 1846
Magazines disestablished in 1988
Monthly magazines published in Germany
Magazines published in Berlin